Sarah Jones (born November 29, 1974) is an American playwright, actress, and poet.

Called "a master of the genre" by The New York Times, Jones has written and performed four multi-character solo shows, including  Bridge & Tunnel, which was produced Off-Broadway in 2004 by Oscar-winner Meryl Streep, and then on to Broadway in 2006 where it received a Special Tony Award.

Life 

Jones was born in Baltimore, Maryland, to an African American father and mother of mixed Euro-American and Caribbean descent.  Her multicultural background and upbringing in Boston, Washington, D.C., and Queens, New York, influenced her development into what The New Yorker termed a "multicultural mynah bird [who] lays our mongrel nation before us with gorgeous, pitch-perfect impersonations of the rarely heard or dramatized."

Jones attended The United Nations International School and Bryn Mawr College where she was the recipient of the Mellon Minority Fellowship. She originally planned a career as a lawyer, but left college early and eventually found her way to the Nuyorican Poets Cafe in New York, where she began competing in poetry slams.

Career 
Her first solo show, Surface Transit, debuted at the Nuyorican Poets Cafe in 1998. It featured monologues based on her poetry which she performed in character. After gaining the attention of feminist icon Gloria Steinem and human rights organization Equality Now, Jones was commissioned by the organization to write and perform her next project, Women Can't Wait!, to address discriminatory laws against women.

A second commission, for the National Immigration Forum to raise awareness about immigrant rights issues, yielded Waking the American Dream, the solo show that became the basis for Bridge & Tunnel, which set an Off-Broadway box office record during its six-month, sold-out run in New York in 2004.

In 2001, Jones recorded and released "Your Revolution" which makes a play against the lyrics and behavior of MC's in Hip hop. When the song made its way to a radio station in Portland, the station was fined $7000 by the FCC, citing the song as "indecent". Jones decided to fight the fine and the "freeze out" of the poem/song by appealing it. After a two-year wait in 2003, the NYCLU and ACLU joined the appeal and won the case. The FCC rescinded their initial notice citing the song as "indecent" and made it available for radio play.

In 2005, a commission from the W. K. Kellogg Foundation to raise awareness of ethnic and racial health disparities in the U.S. resulted in A Right to Care, Jones' fourth solo piece, which premiered in 2005 at the Kellogg Foundation's 75th Anniversary conference alongside keynote speaker President Jimmy Carter.

Jones recently returned to her UN School roots by becoming an Ambassador for UNICEF as its first ever Official Spokesperson on Violence Against Children, traveling and performing for audiences from Indonesia to Ethiopia, the Middle East and Japan.

A recipient of the 2007 Brendan Gill Prize, Jones has also received grants and commissions from the Ford Foundation, New York State Council on the Arts, and others. She has also obtained a Helen Hayes Award, two Drama Desk Award nominations, and HBO's US Comedy Arts Festival's Best One Person Show Award, as well as a New York Civil Liberties Union Calloway Award in recognition of Jones as the first artist in history to sue the Federal Communications Commission for censorship. The lawsuit resulted in reversal of a censorship ruling, which had targeted her hip-hop poem recording "Your Revolution" in which she makes a powerful statement against sexual exploitation of women in hip hop music.

A regular guest on public radio, Jones has also made numerous TV appearances on programs including Charlie Rose, The Today Show, CBS Sunday Morning, Live with Regis and Kelly, and Sesame Street as Mr. Noodle's Other Sister, Ms. Noodle on Elmo's World. Sarah Jones also co-stars as Yasmin, a series regular in the 2021 Netflix series On The Verge created by Julie Delpy and produced by CanalPlus.

In 2022, Jones directed, wrote, produced, and starred in Sell/Buy/Date a hybrid documentary-comedy film, which had its world premiere at South by Southwest in March 2022. It was released in theaters on October 14, 2022, by Cinedigm. It streamed on Amazon on November 8, 2022.

References

External links

 
 
 "A one-woman global village" (TED2009)
 "What does the future hold? 11 characters offer quirky answers" (TED2014)
 "One woman, five characters, and a sex lesson from the future" (TED2015)
 
 
 
 

1974 births
Living people
African-American actresses
American stage actresses
American women poets
American women dramatists and playwrights
American people of Jamaican descent
Actresses from Baltimore
Bryn Mawr College alumni
Slam poets
Special Tony Award recipients
21st-century American poets
United Nations International School alumni
21st-century American actresses
21st-century African-American women writers
21st-century American women writers
21st-century African-American writers
20th-century African-American people
20th-century African-American women